San Michele di Pagana is a frazione (hamlet) of the comune of Rapallo, Metropolitan City of Genoa, Liguria, northern Italy. Facing the Gulf of Tigullio, it is located some 2 km from the center of the municipality and from the nearby comune of Santa Margherita Ligure.

Prominent features in the village include the parish church of San Michele Arcangelo and the 17th century Castle of Punta Pagana.

References

Frazioni of the Province of Genoa
Rapallo